Al Munassir was an amphibious warfare vessel operated by the Royal Navy of Oman.  It was purchased to enable the kingdom to respond to threats to the strategically important Musandam Governorate. The vessel was launched in 1978 and, after decommissioning, was sunk as an artificial reef in 2003. It is now a popular diving site.

Design 
Al Munassir was ordered in 1977 from Brooke Marine by the government of Oman and laid down on 4 July that year. A complement of forty five, including nine officers, was carried.

Fire support was to be provided by a single OTO Melara 76 mm gun mounted on forward and a pair of Oerlikon 20 mm cannon mounted midships, while a helipad aft could accommodate a helicopter up to the size of a Westland Sea King. In addition to an Ericsson laser and LSE optical rangefinders, the vessel was equipped with a Decca TM 1229 navigational radar and Reifon Omega navigator, a Kelvin Hughes MS 45 echo sounder.

Service 
Laid down on 4 July 1977, launched on 25 July 1978 and commissioned on 31 January 1979, Al Munassir served as an amphibious operation and logistics vessel for the Omani fleet. The principal purpose for the vessel was to support the Musandam Governorate in the Strait of Hormuz. This area, which is strategically important for the transportation of crude oil, has no land border with the rest of Oman. In the event of a crisis, the vessel, supported by smaller vessels including, from 1985, Nasr al Bahr, was to be used to transport troops and equipment northwards. The vessel was placed in reserve in the mid 1990s and subsequently retired to become a harbour training ship at the end of the twentieth century.

Fate 
Al Munassir was sunk as an artificial reef on 22 April 2003 and is now a popular diving destination. It is now a refuge for wildlife, including the bigeye snapper, bluestreak cleaner wrasse, Indo-Pacific sergeant, moon wrasse, pennant coralfish, ring-tailed cardinalfish, yellowbar angelfish and yellowfin goatfish.

See also
 List of amphibious warfare ships
 List of shipwrecks in 2003
 List of wreck diving sites

References 

1978 ships
Amphibious warfare vessels
Ships built in Lowestoft
Ships sunk as artificial reefs